Burke County Public Schools is the public K-12 school system in Burke County, NC.

Schools

High Schools
 Burke Middle College
 Draughn High School
 East Burke High School
 Freedom High School
 Hallyburton Academy (alternative)
 Patton High School
 STEAM Academy

Middle Schools
 East Burke Middle School
 Heritage Middle School
 Johnson Middle School
 Liberty Middle School
 Table Rock Middle School

Elementary Schools
 Childers Elementary School
 Drexel Elementary School
 Forest Hill Elementary School
 Glen Alpine Elementary School
 Hildebrand Elementary School
 Hillcrest Elementary School
 Icard Elementary School
 Mountain View Elementary School
 Mull Elementary School
 Oak Hill Elementary School
 Salem Elementary School
 Valdese Elementary School
 Young Elementary School

History
The superintendent of Burke County Public Schools (BCPS) is Mr. Larry Putnam. Larry Putnam was elected into office with a 7–0 vote by the Burke County School Board on April 17, 2011.  He preceded Dr. Arthur Stellar, who had become the superintendent of BCPS on September 29, 2009, when, by a majority vote of the Board of Education, was offered a four-year contract.  Dr. Stellar replaced former superintendent David Burleson, who on June 30, 2009, was paid off by the Board of Education, ending a 27-year career in Burke County Schools.  Upon leaving Burke County, David Burleson found a job as principal of North Forsyth High School in Winston-Salem, North Carolina.

References

External links
 

Education in Burke County, North Carolina
School districts in North Carolina